Anti-Protestantism is bias, hatred or distrust against some or all branches of Protestantism and/or its followers.

Anti-Protestantism dates back to before the Protestant Reformation itself, as various pre-Protestant groups such as Arnoldists, Waldensians, Hussites and Lollards were persecuted in Roman Catholic Europe. Protestants were not tolerated throughout most of Europe until the Peace of Augsburg of 1555 approved Lutheranism as an alternative for Roman Catholicism as a state religion of various states within the Holy Roman Empire of the German Nation. Calvinism was not recognized until the Peace of Westphalia of 1648. Other states, such as France, made similar agreements in the early stages of the Reformation. Poland–Lithuania had a long history of religious tolerance. However, the tolerance stopped after the Thirty Years' War in Germany, the persecution of Huguenots and the French Wars of Religion in France, the change in power between Protestant and Roman Catholic rulers after the death of Henry VIII of England in England, and the launch of the Counter-Reformation in Italy, Spain, Habsburg Austria and Poland-Lithuania. Anabaptism arose as a part of the Radical Reformation, lacking the support of the state which Lutheranism and Calvinism enjoyed, and thus was persecuted. Theological disagreement initially led to a Lutheran-Reformed rivalry in the Reformation.

Protestants in Latin America were largely ostracized until the abolition of certain restrictions in the 20th century. Protestantism spread with Evangelicalism and Pentecostalism gaining the majority of followers. North America became a shelter for Protestants who were fleeing Europe after the persecution increased.

Persecution of Protestants in Asia can be put under a common shield of the persecution Christians face in the Middle East and northern Africa, where Islam is the dominant religion.

History 
Anti-Protestantism originated in a reaction by militant societies connected to the Roman Catholic Church alarmed at the spread of Protestantism following the Protestant Reformation of the 16th century. Martin Luther's Proclamation occurred in 1517. By 1540, Pope Paul III had sanctioned the first society pledged to extinguish Protestantism. Christian Protestantism was denounced as heresy, and those supporting these doctrines were excommunicated as heretics. Thus by canon law and the practice and policies of the Holy Roman Empire of the time, Protestants were subject to persecution in those territories, such as Spain, Italy and the Netherlands, in which the Catholic rulers were then the dominant power. This movement was started by the reigning Pope and various political rulers with a more political stake in the controversy then a religious one. These princes instituted policies as part of the Spanish Inquisition. Abuses of that crusade originally authorized other movements such as the Reconquista, and Morisco conversions, and ultimately led to the Counter Reformation and the edicts of the Council of Trent. Therefore, the political repercussions of various European rulers supporting Roman Catholicism for their own political reasons over the new Protestant groups, only subsequently branded as heretical after rejection by the adherents of these doctrines of the Edicts of the Council of Trent, resulted in religious wars and outbreaks of sectarian violence.

Eastern Orthodoxy had comparatively little contact with Protestantism for geographic, linguistic and historical reasons. Protestant attempts to ally with Eastern Orthodoxy proved problematic. In general, most Orthodox had the impression that Protestantism was a new heresy that arose from various previous heresies.

In 1771, Bishop Charles Walmesley published his General History of the Christian Church from her birth to her Final Triumphant States in Heaven chiefly deduced from the Apocalypse of St. John the Apostle, written under the pseudonym of Signor Pastorini. The book forecast the end of Protestantism by 1825 and was published in at least 15 editions and several languages.

By the 19th century and later, some Eastern Orthodox thinkers, such as Nikolai Berdyaev, Seraphim Rose, and John Romanides believed that Northern Europe had become secular or virtually atheist due to its having been Protestant earlier. In recent eras Orthodox anti-Protestantism has grown due to aggressive Protestant proselytization in predominantly Orthodox countries.

Reformation

 
The Protestant Reformation led to a long period of warfare and communal violence between Catholic and Protestant factions, sometimes leading to massacres and forced suppression of the alternative views by the dominant faction in much of Europe.

Anti-Protestantism originated in a reaction by the Catholic Church against the Reformation of the 16th century. Protestants were denounced as heretics and subject to persecution in those territories, such as Spain, Italy and the Netherlands in which the Catholics were the dominant power. This movement was orchestrated by popes and princes as the Counter Reformation.  There were religious wars and eruptions of sectarian hatred such as the St Bartholomew's Day Massacre of 1572, part of the French Wars of Religion in some countries, though not in others.

Fascist Italy

In 1870 the newly formed Kingdom of Italy annexed the remaining Papal States, depriving the Pope of his temporal power. However, Papal rule over Italy was later restored by the Italian Fascist régime (albeit on a greatly diminished scale) in 1929 as head of the Vatican City state; under Mussolini's dictatorship, Catholicism became the state religion of Fascist Italy.

In 1938, the Italian Racial Laws and Manifesto of Race were promulgated by the Fascist régime to both outlaw and persecute Italian Jews and Protestants, especially Evangelicals and Pentecostals. Thousands of Italian Jews and a small number of Protestants died in the Nazi concentration camps.

Francoist Spain
In Franco's authoritarian Spanish State (1936–1975), Protestantism was deliberately marginalized and persecuted. During the Civil War, Franco's regime persecuted the country's 30,000 Protestants, and forced many Protestant pastors to leave the country and various Protestant leaders were executed. Once authoritarian rule was established, non-Catholic Bibles were confiscated by police and Protestant schools were closed. Although the 1945 Spanish Bill of Rights granted freedom of private worship, Protestants suffered legal discrimination and non-Catholic religious services were not permitted publicly, to the extent that they could not be in buildings which had exterior signs indicating it was a house of worship and that public activities were prohibited.

Hostility to mainline Protestantism 

Among theologically conservative Christians (including Catholics and Orthodox Christians, as well as Evangelicals and Protestant fundamentalists), mainline Protestant denominations are often characterized as being theologically liberal to the point where they are no longer true to the Bible or the historic Christian tradition. These perceptions are often linked to highly publicized events, such as the decision to endorse same-sex marriage by the United Church of Christ. While theological liberalism is clearly present within most mainline denominations, surveys show that many within the mainline denominations consider themselves moderate or conservative and holding  traditional Christian theological views.

Hostility to Evangelicals 
In the United States, critics of the policies adopted by the Religious Right, such as opposition to same-sex marriage and abortion, often equate evangelicalism as a movement with the Religious Right. Many evangelicals belong to this political movement, although it is a diverse movement that draws support from other Protestants, Jews, Mormons, Catholics, and Eastern Orthodox, among other non-evangelical groups. Some critics have even suggested that evangelicals are a kind of "fifth column" aimed at turning the United States or other nations into Christian theocracies. Cultural progressive activists have indicated fear of a potential Christian theocracy as one of the reasons for their opposition to the Christian Right.

Some evangelical groups that hold to a Dispensationalist interpretation of Biblical prophecy have been accused of supporting Zionism and providing material support for Jewish settlers who build communities within Palestinian territories. Critics contend that these evangelicals support Israel in order to expedite the building of the Third Temple in Jerusalem, which Dispensationalists see as a requirement for the return of Jesus Christ. Many evangelicals reject Dispensationalism and support peace efforts in the Middle East, however.

Catholic and Protestant disagreement in Ireland 

In Northern Ireland or pre-Catholic Emancipation Ireland, there is a hostility to Protestantism as a whole that has more to do with communal or nationalist sentiments than theological issues. During the Tudor conquest of Ireland by the Protestant state of England in the course of the 16th century, the Elizabethan state failed to convert Irish Catholics to Protestantism and thus followed a vigorous policy of confiscation, deportation, and resettlement. By dispossessing Catholics of their lands, and resettling Protestants on them, the official Government policy was to encourage a widespread campaign of proselytizing by Protestant settlers and establishment of English law in these areas. This led to a counter effort of the Counter Reformation by mostly Jesuit Catholic clergy to maintain the "old religion" of the people as the dominant religion in these regions. The result was that Catholicism came to be identified with a sense of nativism and Protestantism came to be identified with the State, as most Protestant communities were established by state policy, and Catholicism was viewed as treason to the state after this time. While Elizabeth I had initially tolerated private Catholic worship, this ended after Pope Pius V, in his 1570 papal bull Regnans in Excelsis, pronounced her to be illegitimate and unworthy of her subjects' allegiance.

The Penal Laws, first introduced in the early 17th century, were initially designed to force the native elite to conform to the state church by excluding non-Conformists and Roman Catholics from public office, and restricting land ownership, but were later, starting under Queen Elizabeth, also used to confiscate virtually all Catholic owned land and grant it to Protestant settlers from England and Scotland. The Penal Laws had a lasting effect on the population, due to their severity (celebrating Catholicism in any form was punishable by death or enslavement under the laws), and the favouritism granted Irish Anglicans served to polarise the community in terms of religion. Anti-Protestantism in Early Modern Ireland 1536–1691 thus was also largely a form of hostility to the colonisation of Ireland. Irish poetry of this era shows a marked antipathy to Protestantism, one such poem reading, "The faith of Christ [Catholicism] with the faith of Luther is like ashes in the snow". The mixture of resistance to colonization and religious disagreements led to widespread massacres of Protestant settlers in the Irish Rebellion of 1641. Subsequent religious or sectarian antipathy was fueled by the atrocities committed by both sides in the Irish Confederate Wars, especially the repression of Catholicism during and after the Cromwellian conquest of Ireland, when Irish Catholic land was confiscated en masse, clergy were executed and discriminatory legislation was passed against Catholics.

The Penal Laws against Catholics (and also Presbyterians) were renewed in the late 17th and early 18th centuries due to fear of Catholic support for Jacobitism after the Williamite War in Ireland and were slowly repealed in 1771–1829. Penal Laws against Presbyterians were relaxed by the Toleration Act of 1719, due to their siding with the Jacobites in a 1715 rebellion. At the time the Penal Laws were in effect, Presbyterians and other non-Conformist Protestants left Ireland and settled in other countries. Some 250,000 left for the New World alone between the years 1717 and 1774, most of them arriving there from Ulster.

Sectarian conflict was continued in the late 18th century in the form of communal violence between rival Catholic and Protestant factions over land and trading rights (see Defenders (Ireland), Peep O'Day Boys and Orange Institution). The 1820s and 1830s in Ireland saw a major attempt by Protestant evangelists to convert Catholics, a campaign which caused great resentment among Catholics.

In modern Irish nationalism, anti-Protestantism is usually more nationalist than religious in tone. The main reason for this is the identification of Protestants with unionism – i.e. the support for the maintenance of the union with the United Kingdom, and opposition to Home Rule or Irish independence. In Northern Ireland, since the foundation of the Free State in 1921, Catholics, who were mainly nationalists, suffered systematic discrimination from the Protestant unionist majority. The same happened to Protestants in the Catholic-dominated South. [not in citation given]

The mixture of religious and national identities on both sides reinforces both anti-Catholic and anti-Protestant sectarian prejudice in the province.

More specifically religious anti-Protestantism in Ireland was evidenced by the acceptance of the Ne Temere decrees in the early 20th century, whereby the Catholic Church decreed that all children born into mixed Catholic-Protestant marriages had to be brought up as Catholics. Protestants in Northern Ireland had long held that their religious liberty would be threatened under a 32-county Republic of Ireland, due to that country's Constitutional support of a "special place" for the Roman Catholic Church. This article was deleted in 1972.

During The Troubles in Northern Ireland, Protestants with no connection to the security forces were occasionally targeted by Irish republican paramilitaries. In 1976, eleven Protestant workmen were shot by a group which was identified in a telephone call as the "South Armagh Republican Action Force". Ten of the men died, and the sole survivor said, "One man... did all the talking and proceeded to ask each of us our religion. Our Roman Catholic works colleague was ordered to clear off and the shooting started." A 2011 report from the Historical Enquiries Team (HET) found, "These dreadful murders were carried out by the Provisional IRA and none other."

See also 

 Religious tolerance
 Anti-Christian sentiment
 Anti-Catholicism
 Anti-Eastern Orthodox sentiment
 Anti-Oriental Orthodox sentiment
 Anti-Mormonism
Black legend (Spain)
 Counter-Reformation
 List of people burned as heretics
Criticism of Protestantism

References

External links 
Poll of Catholics

 
Relations between Christian denominations